Pasig City Science High School is a specialized public secondary school in Pasig. It is under the administration of the local government of Pasig and is recognized by the Department of Education. The school offers scholarship programs for students of Pasig who are gifted in science and technology.

History
Pasig City Science High School (Pasig Science, formal or PaSci, informal) was established in 2005 under the administration of Pasig Mayor Soledad Eusebio. After a year of operation at the Pamantasan ng Lungsod ng Pasig, the school moved to its own building adjacent to the Rainforest Park in Maybunga. The school's first principal was Mr. Noel Salalima. He served as principal until 2013. He was then followed by Mr. Jay Mathias Arellano from S.y. 2014 until June 2018. The current principal of the school is Mr. Charlie O. Fababaer.

Current times

The school added a new building with six floors on December 18, 2013, inaugurated by then-mayor Ms. Maribel Andaya Eusebio and the City Council. It was first used by the Grade 7 students of the academic year 2014–2015. These classrooms are fully air-conditioned.

The school is currently headed by Mr. Charlie Fababaer who started his term in July 2018.

References

Science high schools in Metro Manila
Schools in Pasig
2005 establishments in the Philippines
Educational institutions established in 2005